2010–11 National First Division, was the season from September 2010 until May 2011, of South Africa's second tier of professional football. The overall NFD champion was promoted to the first level, known as Premier Soccer League (PSL). While the losing team of the championship final, faced a round robin playoff stage, against the second lowest ranked team of PSL and the two second ranked teams of the NFD streams.

Season structure
The league is made up of 16 teams, split into 2 streams. Each team plays the other 7 teams in their stream 3 times, for a total of 21 games. Teams receive 3 points for a win, 1 for draw, and 0 for a loss. At the end of the season, the top ranked team from each stream play in a two-legged final, the winner of which is crowned National First Division Champion, and gains automatic promotion to the Premier Soccer League for the next season. The loser of the final, along with the teams which came second in their streams, and the 15th placed PSL team, go into the PSL promotion play-offs. The two teams finishing in last place in their streams are automatically relegated to the Vodacom League. They are replaced by the finalists of the Vodacom League championship game.

Club and stadium information
Coastal Stream (excl. Northern Cape):

Inland Stream (incl. Northern Cape):

League standings

Coastal Stream

Inland Stream

Post season

NFD Final
The winner of the two streams, Bay United and Jomo Cosmos will meet and play a two legged tie, on May 14 and May 22, to determine the overall 2010–11 NFD championship. The NFD champion will gain an automatic promotion to the PSL. While the looser of the NFD Final will get a second chance to promote to PSL, at the Promotion Play Offs.

Promotion playoffs
The losing team of the NFD Final (Bay United), together with both runnerups of the NFD streams (Thanda Royal Zulu and Black Leopards), and finally the second lowest ranked team of PSL (Vasco da Gama), entered into the promotion playoffs. This playoff competition was played as a cup with two legged matches, with an unseeded draw to decide the fixtures.
The two semifinals were scheduled to be played simultaneously at May 25 and 29. Due to Black Leopards having qualified for the 2011 Nedbank Cup final at May 28, the two semifinals were however rescheduled, to be played at June 8 and 11. A two legged final with the two winning teams from the semifinal, was played on June 15 and 18. Only the winner of the promotion playoff final was get promoted to play the next season in PSL.

Semifinals:

Promotion playoff final:

References

External links
PSL.co.za

National First Division seasons
South
2010–11 in South African soccer leagues

pt:Temporada 2010–11 da PSL